Stephenson v Waite Tileman Limited [1973] 1 NZLR 152 is a case in New Zealand regarding causation and remoteness.  That is, the case addressed whether a person is responsible for the injuries of another person if the injuries are very remote from their cause.  The court answered affirmatively.

References

New Zealand tort case law
1972 in New Zealand law